The Khanate of Bukhara (or Khanate of Bukhoro) was an Uzbek state in Central Asia from 1500 to 1785, founded by the Abu'l-Khayrid dynasty, a branch of the Shaybanids. From 1533 to 1540, Bukhara briefly became its capital during the reign of Ubaydallah Khan. The khanate reached its greatest extent and influence under its penultimate Abu'l-Khayrid ruler, the scholarly Abdullah Khan II (r. 1557–1598).

In the 17th and 18th centuries, the Khanate was ruled by the Janid Dynasty (Astrakhanids or Toqay Timurids). They were the last Genghisid descendants to rule Bukhara. In 1740, it was conquered by Nader Shah, the Shah of Iran. After his death in 1747, the khanate was controlled by the non-Genghisid descendants of the Uzbek emir Khudayar Bi, through the prime ministerial position of ataliq. In 1785, his descendant, Shah Murad, formalized the family's dynastic rule (Manghit dynasty), and the khanate became the Emirate of Bukhara. The Manghits were non-Genghisid and took the Islamic title of Emir instead of Khan since their legitimacy was not based on descent from Genghis Khan.

Abu'l-Khayrid dynasty

Rise of Muhammad Shibani 

The first dynasty to rule the khanate was the Abu'l-Khayrid dynasty, which reigned from 1500 until 1598. They were a branch of the Shibanids and claimed descent from Genghis Khan through his son Jochi. The ancestor of the ruling Abu'l-Khayrids, Abu'l Khayr Khan, established an empire that by the time of his death in 1469 stretched from Siberia to the Syr Darya river. He controlled the cities of Sighnaq, Suzaq, Arquq, Uzgend, and Yassi along the Syr Darya. However, the Uzbek tribes remained nomadic, living a life on the steppe, and Abu'l Khayr Khan had no interest in conquering the lands of Transoxiana or Khorasan. Following his death, his empire broke up into smaller pieces led by sultans and tribal chieftains. One of these units was led by Muhammad Shibani, Abu'l Khayr's grandson. He was well-educated, had great military intellect, and desired to conquered the sedentary lands of Mawarannahr for himself.

In the 1490s Muhammad Shibani swept through Central Asia and conquered Samarqand, Bukhara, Tashkent, and Andijan from 1500 to 1503. One of his most ferocious enemies was Zahir ud-Din Muhammad Babur, the Timurid prince of Ferghana. He managed to briefly occupy Samarqand from Muhammad Shibani, and attempted on two other occasions to take it. A turning point in the conflict between the two was the Battle of Sar-i Pul in the spring of 1501, which resulted in Babur's defeat.

In 1505 Muhammad Shibani took Urgench after a 10-month siege, resulting in the annexation of Khwarazm. The ruler of Herat, Sultan Husayn Bayqara, attempted to launch a campaign to Transoxiana but it proved to be abortive. When he decided to take the field, he was no longer capable of leading the army. In 1506 he died, being succeeded by his two sons (Badi' al-Zaman Mirza and Muzaffar Husayn Mirza). Despite their differences, they agreed to jointly field an army against the Uzbeks. They assembled their forces along the Murghab River, allying with Babur to crush Muhammad Shibani. In 1506 Shibani captured Balkh, and the allied Timurid force disintegrated on its own. Finally in 1507 he was able to take Herat and the rest of the Timurid lands. By this time he ousted the Timurids from Qunduz, Balkh, Khorasan, Khwarazm, and other regions and incorporated them into his empire.

However Shah Isma'il I of the newly founded Safavid Empire, wishing to conquer the Timurid lands for himself and enraged by Shibani's staunch Sunnism, invaded Khorasan and killed Mohammad Shibani outside the city of Merv in 1510. Khorasan and Khwarazm were conquered by Iran and Samarqand was briefly lost to Babur in 1512. However, he was unable to establish his presence there for long and soon the Uzbeks were able to reclaim their lost territory. However, Khwarazm permanently became independent, becoming the Khanate of Khiva. It was ruled by the Arabshahids, another branch of the Shibanids. Khwarazm was briefly conquered by Ubaydullah Khan (1533-1539) but shortly after it became independent once again.

Janid Dynasty

The Janid Dynasty (descendants of Astrakhanids) ruled the Khanate from 1599 until 1747. Yar Muhammad and his family had escaped from Astrakhan after Astrakhan fell to Russians. He had a son named Jani Muhammad who had two sons named Baqi Muhammad and Vali Muhammad Khan from his wife, who was the daughter of the last Shaybanid ruler.

The son of Din Muhammad Sultan - Baqi Muhammad Khan in 1599 defeated Pir Muhammad Khan II, who had lost his authority. He became the real founder of a new dynasty of Janids or Ashtarkhanids in the Bukhara Khanate (1599–1756). Boqi Muhammad Khan, despite his short reign, carried out administrative, tax and military reforms in the country, which contributed to its further development. He issued coins with the inscription Baqi Muhammad Bahadurkhan and the names of the first four caliphs.

During this period, the Uzbek poet Turdy wrote critical poems and called for the unity of 92 tribal Uzbek people. The most famous Uzbek poet is Mashrab, who composed a number of poems that are still popular today. In the 17th and early 18th centuries, historical works were written in Persian. Among the famous historians, Abdurahman Tole, Muhammad Amin Bukhari, Mutribi should be noted.

In the sources of the second half of the 17th century, the expression “92 Uzbek tribes” is used in relation to the part of the population of the Bukhara Khanate.

After the assassination of Ubaydullah Khan on March 18, 1711, the Bukharan state disintegrated into multiple different principalities. According to Chekhovich, only the districts of Qarakul, Wardanzi, Wabkent, and Ghijduwan were under the new Bukharan khan, Abu'l-Fayz. Other sources report that his authority didn't stretch beyond the Bukharan citadel.

Janid decline and Manghit takeover 
The Ashtarkhanids were replaced by the Uzbek Manghit dynasty, whose members ruled Bukhara until 1920.

The beginning of the strengthening of the political influence of representatives of the Uzbek Manghit aristocracy in the Bukhara Khanate dates back to the beginning of the 17th century. But the real growth of their power occurred after the appointment in 1712 of Khudayar-biy Manghit to the post of ataliq. His son Muhammad Hakim-biy took the post of divanbegi at the court of Abulfeyz-khan. In 1715–1716, Khudayar-biy was removed from his post at the initiative of Ibrahim-parvanachi from the Uzbek family of keneges. In 1719–1720, after the flight of Ibrahim-bey from Bukhara, Khudayar-bey, who was in Balkh, was allowed to return to power, giving him the inheritance of Karshi, which was the result of the policy of his son Muhammad Hakim-bey. In 1721, Muhammad Hakim-biy was appointed ataliq.

During the campaign of the Afsharid ruler of Persia Nadir Shah to Maverannahr in 1740, Muhammad Hakim-biy went to peace negotiations with him, thus saving the country from war and strengthening his power. He had five sons: Muhammad Badal-biy, Kurban-mirahur (died in 1733), Muhammad Rahim, Yav Kashti-biy, Barat-sultan. His third son, Muhammad Rahim, joined Nadir Shah and participated in his further campaigns.

Since 1740, the actual power in the Bukhara Khanate was in the hands of the last ataliqs from the Uzbek clan Manghit, Muhammad Hakim-biy (1740–1743), Muhammad Rakhim (1745–1753) and Daniyal-biy (1758–1785). The Bukhara khans turned out to be completely dependent on them.

In 1747, after the assassination of Abulfayz Khan, the actual power was completely in the hands of Muhammad Rahim. Until 1756, the nominal rulers were the Ashtarkhanid babies Abdulmumin Khan (1747–1751), Ubaydallah Khan III (1751–1754) and Abulgazi Khan (1754–1756). Muhammad Rahim himself married the daughter of Abulfayz Khan. Under Mohammad Rahim Bi, the Bukhara Khanate was able to expand to the regions of Hissar, Samarqand, Urgut, the Zarafshan Valley, Kulab, Jizzakh, and Ura Tepe. Within three years he was also able to subdue Zamin, Panjkent, and Falgar. Although Muhammad Rakhim Khan was not a descendant of Genghis Khan, through tough politics and good organization, he was able to achieve recognition of his power, ascend the throne and even take the title of Khan.

Rahim Bi had to suppress the power of the local chieftains. He attacked Turghai Murad Burqut, ruler of Nurota and the Miyankal province between Samarqand and Bukhara. The latter was forced to accept Bukharan sovereignty. In 1753 Rahim Bi attacked Urgut and subjugated Shahr-i Sabz, Hissar, and Kulab. In 1754 he successfully incorporated Khujand, Tashkent, and Turkestan into the khanate. In November 1762, Bukharan armies conquered the town of Charjuy and subdued the Turkmen.

Culture 

Muhammad Shibani was fond of poetry, and Turkic language collections of his poetry are extant today. There are sources that Muhammad Shibani wrote poetry in both Turkic and Persian. The "Divan" of Muhammad Shibani's poems, written in the Central Asian Turkic literary language, is currently kept in the Topkapi manuscript collection in Istanbul. The manuscript of his philosophical and religious work: "Bahr ul-Khudo", written in the Central Asian Turkic literary language in 1508, is located in London.

Muhammad Shibani wrote poetry under the pseudonym "Shibani". He wrote a prose work called Risale-yi maarif-i Shibani. It was written in the Turkic-Chagatai language in 1507 shortly after his capture of Khorasan and is dedicated to his son, Muhammad Timur-Sultan (the manuscript is kept in Istanbul). Ubaydullah Khan was a very educated person, he skillfully recited the Koran and provided it with comments in the Turkic language, was a gifted singer and musician. The formation of the most significant court literary circle in Maverannahr in the first half of the 16th century is associated with the name of Ubaydullah Khan. Ubaydullah Khan himself wrote poetry in Turkic, Persian and Arabic under the literary pseudonym Ubaydiy. A collection of his poems has survived to this day. 

Turkish historiography increased in the early 16th century, though their production were relatively few. Muhammad Shibani Khan's reign influenced one Chagatai's Turkish historical work, the Shibani-nama, while the, Tawarikh-i Guzida-yi Nusrat-nama, was sponsored by the Khan himself. The Khan also inspired two Persian histories by Bina'i and Shadi, while patronizing the translations of six works from Persian into Chaghatai.

In the Abu'l-Khayrid era in the Bukhara Khanate, Agha-i Buzurg or "Great Lady" was a famous scholarly woman-Sufi (she died in 1522–23), she was also called "Mastura Khatun".

Abd al-Aziz Khan (1540–1550) established a library "having no equal" the world over. The prominent scholar Sultan Mirak Munshi worked there from 1540. The gifted calligrapher Mir Abid Khusaini produced masterpieces of Nastaliq and Rayhani script. He was a brilliant miniature-painter, master of encrustation, and was the librarian (kitabdar) of Bukhara's library.

List of rulers

Janids 
Baqi Muhammad Khan (1599–1605)
Vali Muhammad Khan (1605–1611)
Imam Quli Khan (1611–1642)
Nadr Muhammad Khan (1642–1645)
Abd al-Aziz Khan (1645–1680)
Subhan Quli Khan (1680–1702)
Ubaidullah Khan (1702 – March 18, 1711)
Abu'l-Fayz Khan (1711–1747)
Muhammad Abd al-Mumin (1747–1748)
Muhammad Ubaidullah II (1748–1753, nominal)

Manghits 
Muhammad Rahim (usurper), atalik (1753–1756), khan (1756–1758)
Shir Ghazi (1758–?)
Abu'l-Ghazi Khan (1758–1785)

See also
Russian conquest of Central Asia
List of Turkic dynasties and countries
List of Sunni Muslim dynasties

References

Sources

Further reading

External links

 The Ashtarkhanid Rulers of Bukhara

 
1785 disestablishments
States and territories established in 1500
Bukhara, Khan
Bukhara
1500 establishments in Asia
History of Bukhara